The Israel Defense Forces parade was an event during the first 25 years of the State of Israel's existence to celebrate its military might. It was cancelled after 1973 due to financial concerns.

The first IDF parade took place during the 1948 Arab-Israeli War, on July 27, 1948, on Allenby Street and Ben Yehuda Street in Tel Aviv.

The second parade took place in 1949, on Israel's first independence day, in Tel Aviv. It failed in the process because the overenthusiastic crowd burst into the parade ground. It was nicknamed "The parade that did not march".

Starting with the third parade in 1950, annual parades were held on the country's independence day, ending in 1968. Citing financial concerns, it was then decided that the parade should only be held on special occasions. The last IDF parade thus took place in 1973, on Israel's 25th birthday.

The Israel Defense Forces still has weapon exhibitions country-wide on Independence Day, but they are stationary and have a limited scale. The first ever IDF parade in years was held on Jerusalem Day 1997 to mark the golden jubilee since independence and the 30th anniversary of the IDF capture of the Old City of Jerusalem.

Parade locations

References

Israel Defense Forces
Military parades
Parades in Israel
1948 establishments in Israel
Recurring events established in 1948
Annual events in Israel
1973 disestablishments in Israel
Recurring events disestablished in 1973